Kristin F. Cast (born November 4, 1986) is an American author of young adult books. She is the editor for the House of Night series for young adults with her mother, P.C. Cast, and the author of The Escaped series.

Life and career

Cast graduated from Broken Arrow Senior High School in 2005.

Cast is biracial and has Nigerian ancestry.

Cast lives in Portland, Oregon

In 2007, the House of Night series began with the publishing of its first book, Marked. It was created by Kristin and her mother, P.C. Cast, with Kristin beginning when she was 19-years-old. Kristin was an editor for the series. The last book of the series was Redeemed, published in 2014.

In 2014, Cast signed a five-book deal with Diversion Books for a series called The Escaped. In 2015, she released the first book of the series, Amber Smoke.

In 2019, it was announced that Don Carmody and David Cormican, producers of the Shadowhunters television series, would create a House of Night live-action television show.

As of September 2020, Cast and her mother have created more than 20 books together.

Works

House of Night series
Co-created with P.C. Cast
 Marked, St. Martin's Press (SMP), 2007
 Betrayed, SMP, 2007
 Chosen, SMP, 2008
 Untamed, SMP, 2008
 Hunted, SMP, 2009
 Tempted, SMP, 2009
 Burned, SMP, 2010
 Awakened, SMP, 2011
 Destined, SMP,  2011 
 Hidden, SMP, 2012
 Revealed, SMP, 2013
 Redeemed, SMP, 2014

House of Night novellas
Dragon's Oath, SMP, 2011
Lenobia's Vow, SMP, 2012
Neferet's Curse, SMP, 2013
Kalona's Fall, St. Martin's, 2014 (before Redeemed in House of Night)

The Escaped series
 Amber Smoke, Diversion Publishing, 2015
 Scarlet Rain, Diversion Publishing, 2016
Cerulean Sea, Diversion Publishing, 2020

The Escaped novella 
The Scent of Salt & Sand, Diversion Publishing, 2016 (between books 2 and 3 of The Escaped)

Sisters of Salem series 
 Spells Trouble, Wednesday Books, 2021
 Omens Bite, Wednesday Books, 2022 (ISBN 9781250765666)

Other Novels 
 The Dysasters, Wednesday Books, 2019, with P.C. Cast

References

External links
 Website of the series.
 http://ra.okstate.edu/osu_tulsa/WritingOutLoud/KristinCast/video.htm

1986 births
Living people
21st-century American novelists
American fantasy writers
American romantic fiction writers
American women novelists
House of Night series
Writers from Tulsa, Oklahoma
University of Tulsa alumni
American writers of young adult literature
Women science fiction and fantasy writers
Women romantic fiction writers
21st-century American women writers
Women writers of young adult literature
Novelists from Oklahoma